Sergei Olegovich Tereshchenko (born 18 January 1984) is a former Russian former professional footballer.

Club career
He made his debut for FC Torpedo-Metallurg Moscow on 6 June 2003 in a Russian Premier League Cup game against FC Torpedo Moscow.

In 2004 he played in the Belarusian Premier League.

External links

1984 births
Footballers from Moscow
Living people
Russian footballers
Association football defenders
FC Moscow players
FC Vitebsk players
Belarusian Premier League players
Russian expatriate footballers
Expatriate footballers in Belarus